Aadu Luukas (24 September 1939, in Tallinn – 7 October 2006, in Viimsi) was an Estonian businesspeople and sport personnel.

Since 1992, he was the head of the company AS Pakterminal.

Since 1997, he was the president of Estonian Volleyball Federation.

In 2003, he was awarded the Order of the White Star, III Class and in 2006, he was awarded with Order of the White Star, II class.

References

1939 births
2006 deaths
Estonian businesspeople
Estonian sportspeople
Recipients of the Order of the White Star, 2nd Class
Recipients of the Order of the White Star, 3rd Class
Tallinn University of Technology alumni
People from Tallinn
Sportspeople from Tallinn